The 1995–96 Texas Longhorns men's basketball team represented The University of Texas at Austin in intercollegiate basketball competition during the 1995–96 season. The Longhorns were led by fourth-year head coach Tom Penders. The team finished the season with a 21–10 overall record and finished third in Southwest Conference regular season play with a 10–4 conference record. Texas advanced to the NCAA tournament, defeating No. 7 seed Michigan in the opening round before falling to No. 2 seed Wake Forest in the second round.

Roster

Schedule and results

|-
!colspan=12 style=| Non-Conference Regular season

|-
!colspan=12 style=| SWC Regular season

|-
!colspan=12 style=| Southwest Conference tournament

|-
!colspan=12 style=| 1996 NCAA Tournament – Midwest No. 10 seed

Rankings

References

Texas Longhorns men's basketball seasons
Texas
Texas
Texas Longhorns Basketball Team
Texas Longhorns Basketball Team